Exhibit design (or exhibition design) is the process of developing an exhibit—from a concept through to a physical, three-dimensional exhibition. It is a continually evolving field, drawing on innovative, creative, and practical solutions to the challenge of developing communicative environments that ‘tell a story’ in a three-dimensional space.

There are many people who collaborate to design exhibits such as directors, curators, and technicians. These positions have great importance because how they design affects how people learn. 

A good exhibition designer will consider the whole environment in which a story is being interpreted rather than just concentrating on individual exhibits.

Description

Exhibit designers (or exhibition designers) use a wide range of technologies and techniques to develop experiences that will resonate with diverse audiences–enabling these targeted audiences to access the messages, stories and objects of an exhibit.
There are many different types of exhibit, ranging from museum exhibitions, to retail and trades show spaces, to themed attractions, zoos, and visitor centers. All types of exhibits aim to communicate a message through engaging their audiences in meaningful and compelling interactions.
   
Exhibit design is a collaborative process, integrating the disciplines of architecture, landscape architecture, graphic design, audiovisual engineering, digital media, lighting, interior design, and content development to develop an audience experience that interprets information, involves and engages a user and influences their understanding of a subject.  Throughout the planning and design process, exhibit designers work closely with graphic designers, content specialists, architects, fabricators, technical specialists, audiovisual experts, and, in the case of museums and other mission-based institutions, stakeholders like community members, government agencies, and other partner organizations.
  
The exhibit design process builds on a conceptual or interpretive plan for an exhibit, determining the most effective, engaging and appropriate methods of communicating a message or telling a story. The process will often mirror the architectural process or schedule, moving from conceptual plan, through schematic design, design development, contract document, fabrication, and installation. The first phases establish a thematic direction and develop creative and appropriate design solutions to achieve the interpretive and communication goals of the exhibit. The latter phases employ technical expertise in translating the visual language of the designs into detailed documents that provide all the specifications required to fabricate and install an exhibit.

Exhibition design in different parts of the world are influenced by the local culture as well as the availability of materials. Exhibition design in Europe is considered as a meeting place for relationship building while in North America energy is spent on creating a sense of place and building community.

One of the major shifts in museum and exhibit design in the last decade has been a focus on visitor experience.  By identifying the five types of museum visitors and their needs and expectations, museums can design their exhibits to give a positive visitor experience.  Participatory activities are also becoming more popular, Nina Simon has done research describing and identifying themes and trends in museums that will attract visitors and educate them in fun and engaging ways.

See also
Cultural tourism
Exhibition designer

References

Museum design
Communication design
Exhibitions